Gustavo Barreiros de Albuquerque (born June 28, 1991) is a Brazilian rugby sevens player. He represented  at the 2016 Summer Olympics.

References

External links 
 
 

1991 births
Living people
Male rugby sevens players
Brazilian rugby union players
Olympic rugby sevens players of Brazil
Brazil international rugby sevens players
Rugby sevens players at the 2016 Summer Olympics
People from Maringá
Brazilian rugby sevens players
Sportspeople from Paraná (state)